The Jadar region begins roughly at the Osečina and it is divided in two sub-regions: Upper Jadar (around Osečina), which is part of much larger region of Rađevina, and Lower Jadar, which is also part of another, larger region of Podrinje. Center of the Lower Jadar is the town of Loznica, which is not on the Jadar river, but some 10 km to the southwest.

The region is located in the Jadar River valley, bordered by the mountains of Vlašić, Cer, Gučevo and Sokolska planina. Lower Jadar is a low, agricultural area, while the Upper Jadar was an important mining region (antimony mines of Zavlaka and Bela Crkva).

In August 1914, during World War I, a major battle between the Austro-Hungarian and Serbian army took place on the river. The Serbs defeated the Austrians. This battle known as Battle of Cer, was the first victory of Allied forces in World War I. The march that is considered to be somewhat an alternative national anthem of Serbia depicts this battle (Marš na Drinu).

A mineral, notable for having a formula similar (lacking fluorine for a complete match) to that of the fictional kryptonite from the Superman comic books and movies, was found in a mine in the Jadar region and has been named jadarite, after the region.

References

 

Kolubara District
Geographical regions of Serbia
Geography of Šumadija and Western Serbia